Bernard Vorhaus (December 25, 1904 – November 23, 2000) was an American film director of Austrian descent, born in New York City. His father was born in Kraków, then part of Austria-Hungary. Vorhaus spent many decades living in the UK. Eearly in his career, he worked as a screenwriter, and co-produced the film The Singing City. He was blacklisted in Hollywood for his communist sympathies, and returned to England, where he resumed his career. Known, alongside Michael Powell, for his quota quickies, Vorhaus also worked in Europe.

Career

The Harvard University graduate, in addition to directing thirty-two films, was also the mentor to future film director David Lean, some of whose work as a film editor early in his career was on Vorhaus pictures.

He worked steadily as a screenwriter in Hollywood while in his 20s for such studios as Columbia Pictures and Fox Studios but wanted to direct movies. He eventually decided to move to England and began directing quota quickies, such as The Last Journey (1935).

After attaining success in England, Vorhaus moved back to the U.S. and began working at Republic Pictures, directing B-movies. He was blacklisted in 1951, as a consequence of the hearings conducted by the House Un-American Activities Committee.

Vorhaus had already moved to Europe at that time and directed a few minor films while there. He finally returned to England and retired from the film business. Unlike contemporaries Joseph Losey and Cy Endfield, who were also on the blacklist, he founded a company Domar Industries, a business specialising in house renovations. The was a resurgence of interest in his films in the 1980s.

Family
Vorhaus had two children, Gwyn and David. the latter was a bass player and electronic music pioneer who worked under the name White Noise.

Selected filmography

 Steppin' Out (US, 1925) author of screenplay
 Seventh Heaven (US, 1927) co-author of screenplay
 No Other Woman (US, 1928) co-author of screenplay
 Sunshine (US, 1928) two-reeler; debut as director
 The Singing City (Germany, 1930) producer; starring Brigitte Helm
 City of Song (UK, 1931) producer
 Money for Speed (UK, 1933)
 Crime on the Hill (UK, 1933)
 The Ghost Camera (UK, 1933)
 On Thin Ice (UK, 1933)
 The Night Club Queen (UK, 1933)
 The Broken Melody (UK, 1934)
 Blind Justice (UK, 1934)
 Dark World (UK, 1935)
 Street Song (UK, 1935)
 Ten Minute Alibi (UK, 1935)
 The Last Journey (UK, 1935)
 Dusty Ermine (UK, 1936)
 Broken Blossoms (UK, 1936) technical supervisor
 Cotton Queen (UK, 1937)
 King of the Newsboys (US, 1938)
 Fisherman's Wharf (US, 1939)
 Way Down South (US, 1939) co-director
 Three Faces West (US, 1940)
 Lady From Louisiana (US, 1941)
 Angels With Broken Wings (US, 1941)
 The Affairs of Jimmy Valentine (US, 1942)
 Recognition of the Japanese Zero Fighter (US, 1943) short film
 Bury Me Dead (US, 1947)
 The Amazing Mr. X (US, 1948) also known as The Spiritualist
 So Young, So Bad (US, 1950)
 The Lady From Boston (France-US, 1951) also known as Pardon My French
 Imbarco a mezzanotte (Italy, 1951) also known as Stranger on the Prowl; replaced by Joseph Losey
 Fanciulle di lusso (Italy, 1953) also known as Finishing School, written by blacklisted writer Norma Barzman
 Roman Holiday (US, 1953) assistant director, under pseudonym

References

External links

 
 
 BritishPictures entry
 

British film directors
Hollywood blacklist
Harvard University alumni
1904 births
2000 deaths
Film directors from New York City
Articles containing video clips
American expatriates in the United Kingdom